(former name; Yasuo Kageyama, 景山 泰男) was a Japanese football player and manager. He played for Japan national team.

Club career
Takamori was born in Okayama Prefecture on March 3, 1934. After graduating from Rikkyo University, he joined Nippon Kokan in 1956. In 1967, Nippon Kokan was promoted Japan Soccer League. He played 28 games in the league. He retired in 1968.

National team career
On January 2, 1955, when Takamori was a Rikkyo University student, he debuted for Japan national team against Burma. In 1956, he was selected Japan for 1956 Summer Olympics in Melbourne. He also played at 1958 Asian Games and 1962 Asian Games. He played 30 games for Japan until 1963.

Coaching career
In 1962, when Takamori played for Nippon Kokan, he became a playing manager. In 1966 season, he promoted the club to Japan Soccer League. However, he did not managed in the league, because he resigned as manager end of 1966 season.

Club statistics

National team statistics

References

External links

 
 Japan National Football Team Database

1934 births
2016 deaths
Rikkyo University alumni
Association football people from Okayama Prefecture
Japanese footballers
Japan international footballers
Japan Soccer League players
NKK SC players
Olympic footballers of Japan
Footballers at the 1956 Summer Olympics
Footballers at the 1958 Asian Games
Footballers at the 1962 Asian Games
Japanese football managers
Player-coaches
Association football defenders
Asian Games competitors for Japan